Bhagwan Parshuram is a 1970 Indian Hindi language drama film directed by Babubhai Mistry. The film stars Abhi Bhattacharya and Jayshree Gadkar.

Plot
This is the story of Lord Parshuram, who beheads his mother in the beginning to prove the duty as directed by his father.

Cast
Abhi Bhattacharya as Parshuram
Jayshree Gadkar as Gayetri
Jeevan as Bhagwan Shri Narad Muni
Trilok Kapoor
D.K. Sapru as Samrat
Sulochana as Renuka
Sunder as Samrat's employee
Helen as an item number

Soundtrack

Remakes
It was originally made a Telugu movie, from Renuka's perspective as Renukadevi Mahatmyam in 1960, which was dubbed into Hindi as Sati Renuka in 1961, and again remade in Kannada as Sri Renukadevi Mahatme in 1977, which was dubbed in Hindi as Veer Parshuram.

References

External links
 

1970 films
1970s Hindi-language films
1970 drama films
Hindu mythological films
Films based on Asian myths and legends
Films directed by Babubhai Mistry
Hindi films remade in other languages